Assembly rooms may refer to:

 Assembly rooms, a gathering place in either the United Kingdom or Ireland
 Assembly Rooms, Belfast
 Assembly Rooms (Edinburgh)
 Assembly Rooms Cinema Hall, in Ooty
 Assembly Rooms Theatre (Durham)
 Barton-upon-Humber Assembly Rooms
 Bath Assembly Rooms, in Bath, England
 Grand Assembly Rooms, an interdisciplinary research facility at Newcastle University
 York Assembly Rooms, in York, England